Nechunayevo is a rural locality (a selo) and the administrative center of Nechunayevsky Selsoviet, Shipunovsky District, Altai Krai, Russia. The population was 788 as of 2013. There are 14 streets.

Geography 
Nechunayevo is located 19 km ENE of Shipunovo (the district's administrative centre) by road. Barchikha is the nearest rural locality.

References 

Rural localities in Shipunovsky District